Altarnun was an electoral division of Cornwall in the United Kingdom which returned one member to sit on Cornwall Council between 2009 and 2021. It was abolished at the 2021 local elections, being succeeded by Altarnun and Stoke Climsland.

Councillors

Extent
Altarnun represented the villages of Laneast, Altarnun, Fivelanes, Polyphant, Lewannick, Coad's Green, North Hill, Middlewood and Bathpool, and the hamlets of Badgall, Bowithick, Bolventor, South Carne, Treween, Trewint, Trevadlock, Trenhorne, Congdon's Shop, Illand, Newtown, Trebartha, Berriowbridge and Penhole. The division was affected by boundary changes at the 2013 election. From 2009 to 2013, the division covered 10,968 hectares in total; after the boundary changes in 2013, it covered 11,695 hectares.

Election results

2017 election

2013 election

2009 election

References

Electoral divisions of Cornwall Council